Amita Nangia (also known as Ameeta Nangia) is a TV actress in Bollywood.  Her initial popularity was from her role as Sheena daughter Shreya in the very famous TV serial Tara, in Season 2 broadcast on Zee TV in 1993. She has acted in Bollywood Horror movies like Purani Haveli and College Girl. She was a sorcerer in the Indian mystery and thriller show, Kaal Bhairav Rahasya. She is also remembered for the role of Radhika in the tele-serial Hum Paanch where Rakhi Vijjan who played Sweety Mathur worked with her.

Filmography

Purani Haveli (1989)
College Girl (1990 film)
Pathar Ke Insan (1990)
Paap Ki Kamaee (1990)
Baaghi (1990 film)
Jeevan Daata (1991)
Saugandh (1991 film)
Afsana Pyar Ka (1991)
Pratigyabadh (1991)
Ranbhoomi (1991)
Pratikar (1991)
Police Matthu Dada (1991)
Rupaye Dus Karod (1991)
Zulm Ki Hukumat (1992)
Ghar Jamai (1992 film)
Geetanjali (1993 film)
Hum Hain Kamaal Ke (1993)
 Raja (1995 film)
 Ajnabee (2001 film)
Chup Chup Ke (2006)
Bhagam Bhag (2007)
 Rajnandini (2021)

Television

References

External links

 
 
 

Living people
Indian television actresses
Actresses in Hindi television
21st-century Indian actresses
Year of birth missing (living people)